is the 15th single by SKE48. It was released on July 30, 2014. It debuted in number one on the weekly Oricon Singles Chart. It was the second best-selling single in July. It has sold a total of 409,535 copies. It reached number one on the Billboard Japan Hot 100. It was the 14th best-selling single of the year in Japan, with 461,539 copies.

Track listing

TYPE-A

TYPE-B

TYPE-C

TYPE-D

Theater Edition

Members

Bukiyō Taiyō 
Team S: Rion Azuma, Masana Oya, Ryoha Kitagawa, Haruka Futamura, Jurina Matsui, Sae Miyazawa, Miyuki Watanabe
Team KII: Mina Oba, Akane Takayanagi, Airi Furukawa, Nao Furuhata, Nana Yamada
Team E]: Tsugumi Iwanaga, Madoka Umemoto, Kanon Kimoto, Haruka Kumazaki, Sumire Sato, Aya Shibata, Akari Suda, Rena Matsui

Coming soon 
Team KII: Mina Oba, Akane Takayanagi, Airi Furukawa
Team E: Sumire Sato, Aya Shibata, Akari Suda, Rena Matsui
Kenkyuusei: Kaori Matsumura

Tomodachi no Mama de 
Team S: Rion Azuma, Ryoha Kitagawa, Jurina Matsui
Team KII: Mina Oba, Akane Takayanagi, Airi Furukawa, Nao Furuhata
Team E: Kanon Kimoto, Akari Suda, Rena Matsui

Houkago Race 
Team S: Rion Azuma, Masana Oya, Ryoha Kitagawa, Risako Goto, Mieko Sato, Mai Takeuchi, Natsumi Tanaka, Rika Tsuzuki, Yuka Nakanishi, Haruka Futamura, Jurina Matsui, Chikako Matsumoto, Sae Miyazawa, Ami Miyamae, Miki Yakata, Suzuran Yamauchi, Miyuki Watanabe

Sayonara Kinou no Jibun 
Team KII: Riho Abiru, Yuki Arai, Anna Ishida, Mikoto Uchiyama, Yuna Ego, Mina Oba, Tomoko Kato, Ruka Kitano, Yukiko Kinoshita, Saki Goudo, Sarina Souda, Yumana Takagi, Natsuki Takatsuka, Akane Takayanagi, Yuzuki Hidaka, Airi Furukawa, Nao Furuhata, Honoka Mizuno, Yukari Yamashita, Nana Yamada, Mizuho Yamada

Banana Kakumei 
Team E: Kyoka Isohara, Narumi Ichino, Tsugumi Iwanaga, Madoka Umemoto, Arisa Owaki, Rumi Kato, Kanon Kimoto, Haruka Kumazaki, Kumiko Koishi, Ami Kobayashi, Makiko Saito, Mei Sakai, Sumire Sato, Aya Shibata, Akari Suda, Sana Takatera, Marika Tani, Nao Fukushi, Rena Matsui, Reika Yamada

Koi Yori mo Dream 
Team E: Akari Suda, Marika Tani
Kenkyuusei: Kaori Matsumura

References 

2014 singles
2014 songs
Avex Trax singles
Japanese-language songs
SKE48 songs
Oricon Weekly number-one singles
Billboard Japan Hot 100 number-one singles